Mansurabad-e Olya (also Romanized as Manşūrābād-e ’Olyā; also known as Manşūrābād-e Bālā) is a village in Rostam-e Do Rural District, in the Central District of Rostam County, Fars Province, Iran. At the 2006 census, its population was 390, in 80 families.

References 

Populated places in Rostam County